The 1974 NFL draft took place at the Americana Hotel in New York City, New York, on January 29–30, 1974. Each of the 26 NFL teams were granted 17 selections for a total of 442 picks.

Many experts consider the 1974 Pittsburgh Steelers to have had the best draft class in NFL history as they selected four players later inducted into the Pro Football Hall of Fame (Lynn Swann, Jack Lambert, John Stallworth, and Mike Webster). A fifth player, Donnie Shell, was signed by Pittsburgh after going unselected in the 1974 NFL Draft; he too was later enshrined in the Hall of Fame. The closest any other team has come to this success in a draft is the Dallas Cowboys' 1964 draft, when three Hall of Famers were taken. The Green Bay Packers' also selected three Hall of Famers in 1958 draft (Jim Taylor, Ray Nitschke and Jerry Kramer).

The Houston Oilers had the first pick in the 1974 draft based on their one-win record in 1973, but they traded the first overall pick—as well as the first pick of the third round, #53 overall—to the Dallas Cowboys in exchange for defensive end Tody Smith and wide receiver Billy Parks. Dallas used the two picks to select two future Pro Bowlers, defensive end Ed "Too Tall" Jones and quarterback Danny White.

This was the first NFL draft since 1938 to not have any quarterbacks taken in the first round, and one of only five. Along with 1988, it is the only draft where no quarterback was taken in the first two rounds, and 1974 is generally regarded as one of the worst quarterback draft classes of all time, with only Danny White (the first quarterback taken, with the first pick in the third round) and fourth round pick Mike Boryla reaching the Pro Bowl, and even Boryla was out of the NFL by 1978.

With the 428th selection, in the 17th round, the Green Bay Packers selected convicted serial killer Randy Woodfield who would become known as the 'I5 killer'.

Player selections

Round one

Round two

Round three

Round four

Round five

Round six

Round seven

Round eight

Round nine

Round ten

Round eleven

Round twelve

Round thirteen

Round fourteen

Round fifteen

Round sixteen

Round seventeen

Notable undrafted players

Hall of Famers
 Jack Lambert, linebacker from Kent State, taken 2nd round 46th overall by Pittsburgh Steelers
Inducted: Professional Football Hall of Fame class of 1990.
 Mike Webster, center from Wisconsin, taken 5th round 125th overall by Pittsburgh Steelers
Inducted: Professional Football Hall of Fame class of 1997.
 Lynn Swann, wide receiver from Southern California, taken 1st round 21st overall by Pittsburgh Steelers
Inducted: Professional Football Hall of Fame class of 2001.
 Dave Casper, tight end from Notre Dame, taken 2nd round 45th overall by Oakland Raiders
Inducted: Professional Football Hall of Fame class of 2002.
 John Stallworth, wide receiver from Alabama A&M, taken 4th round 82nd overall by Pittsburgh Steelers
Inducted: Professional Football Hall of Fame class of 2002.
 Donnie Shell, safety from South Carolina State, undrafted and signed by Pittsburgh Steelers
Inducted: Professional Football Hall of Fame class of 2020.

References

External links
 NFL.com – 1974 Draft
 databaseFootball.com – 1974 Draft
 Pro Football Hall of Fame

National Football League Draft
NFL Draft
Draft
NFL Draft
NFL Draft
American football in New York City
1970s in Manhattan
Sporting events in New York City
Sports in Manhattan